Donner is a surname. Notable people with the surname include:

Aleksander Donner (1948–2013), Ukrainian handball coach
André Donner, Dutch jurist, former President of the European Court of Justice
Clive Donner, British film director
Franziska Donner Austrian wife of Syngman Rhee, first First Lady of the Republic of Korea
Georg Rafael Donner, 18th-century Austrian sculptor
Helmut Donner (born 1941), Austrian high jumper
Jan Donner, Dutch politician, Minister of Justice
Jan Hein Donner, Dutch chess grandmaster and writer
Johan Gustaf af Donner, 18th-century governor of Västerbotten County, Sweden
Johann Jakob Christian Donner (1799-1875), German philologist and translator
Lauren Shuler Donner, American movie producer
Margaretha Donner, 18th-century Swedish businesswoman
Matthäus Donner, 18th-century Austrian sculptor
Members of the Donner family from Finland
Anders Donner Finnish astronomer
Henrik Otto Donner (1939–2013), Finnish composer and musician
Jörn Donner (1933–2020), Finnish writer and filmmaker
Kai Donner, Finnish linguist, ethnographer and politician
Olly Donner (1881-1956), Finnish writer
Ossian Donner, Finnish industrialist and diplomat
Otto Donner, linguist, publisher and politician
Patrick Donner, British Member of Parliament
Piet Hein Donner, Dutch politician 
Ral Donner, American musician
Richard Donner (1930–2021), American film director
Robert Donner, American actor
Steve Donner, American professional sports organizer
William Donner Roosevelt, philanthropist
William Donner, American businessman

Fictional characters
 Eric Donner, a character in the role-playing game Scion
 Frankie Donner, a character on the American soap opera Days of our Lives
 General Gerhard Donner, a character in the film Venus Wars
 Larry Donner, a character in the film Throw Momma from the Train
Lindsay Donner, character on Psi Factor: Chronicles of the Paranormal
 Maddux Donner, a character in the TV series Defying Gravity
 Martin Donner, a character in the Poul Anderson science fiction novella Un-Man
Megan Donner, character on CSI: Miami
 Min Donner, a character in the Stephen R. Donaldson science fiction novel A Dark and Hungry God Arises

See also
Donner (disambiguation)